Morgan Run is an unincorporated community in Coshocton County, in the U.S. state of Ohio.

History
John Morgan built one of the first sawmills in the area on Morgan Run.

References

Unincorporated communities in Coshocton County, Ohio
Unincorporated communities in Ohio